Karavilai is a small village in the Villukuri panchayat,  Kanniyakumari district, in the Indian state of Tamil Nadu.

Most of the family resides belongs to Krishnavaha community. 

Villages in Kanyakumari district